The Rural Municipality of Dundurn No. 314 is a rural municipality (RM) in the Canadian province of Saskatchewan within Census Division No. 11 and  Division No. 5. It is located in the north-central portion of the province along the South Saskatchewan River and surrounds the Town of Dundurn.

History
The RM of Dundurn No. 314 incorporated as a rural municipality on December 13, 1909.

Geography
Notable geographical features in the RM include Brightwater Lake, Blackstrap Lake, Indi Lake, Mount Blackstrap, Brightwater Creek, and Allan Hills.

Communities and localities
The following urban municipalities are surrounded by the RM.

Towns
 Dundurn

Resort villages
 Shields
 Thode

The following unincorporated communities are within the RM.

Organized hamlets
 Beaver Creek

The RM is also home to the Hillcrest Hutterite Colony and the Canadian Forces Ammunition Depot Dundurn Canadian Forces Base.

Demographics

Attractions
 Indi Lake
 Blackstrap Lake
 Blackstrap Provincial Park 
 Lakeside Golf Resort 
 Otopasso MX Par
 Circle H Ranch 
 Beaver Creek Conservation Area
 Haultain Trinity Lutheran Church

Government
The RM of Dundurn No. 314 is governed by an elected municipal council and an appointed administrator that meets on the third Tuesday of every month. The reeve of the RM is Trevor Reid while its administrator is Leanne Mack. The RM's office is located in Dundurn.

Saskatoon—Biggar is the federal electoral district for the RM, which is represented by an elected member of parliament. The member of the legislative assembly represents the Arm River-Watrous provincial constituency.

References

External links

D

Division No. 11, Saskatchewan